The Langfang Stadium (Simplified Chinese: 廊坊体育场) is a multi-use stadium in Langfang, China.  It is currently used mostly for football matches and athletics events.  The stadium has a capacity of 30,040 people. Hebei China Fortune F.C. use the stadium for home games.

Footnotes

Sports venues in Hebei
Football venues in China